This list of alumni of the University of St Andrews includes graduates, non-graduate former students, and current students of the University of St Andrews, Fife, Scotland.

Academics

Educators

Professors and researchers

Sciences

Humanities

Nobel laureates 
The Nobel Prizes are awarded each year for outstanding research, the invention of ground-breaking techniques or equipment, or outstanding contributions to society.

Medicine

Business and finance

Government, law, and public policy 
Note: Individuals who belong in multiple sections appear in the first relevant section.

Politics and public affairs

Members of the Scottish Parliament

Members of the House of Commons

Other

Law

Military and national intelligence

Journalism and media

Literature, writing, and translation

Entertainment

Music

Visual arts

Religion

Royalty and Nobility

Sports

Other

References

External links 

 St Andrews Office of Alumni Relations
 St Andrews Alumnus Chronicle

Alumni of the University of St Andrews
St Andrews